"Hard Magic" is a song by Divine, released in 1985 as the third single from the album Maid in England.

Chart performance
"Hard Magic" was Divine's last single to chart on the UK Singles Chart.  It debuted and peaked at #87 before falling to #90 in its second week.

Music video
The music video for the single features Divine in two roles. One as a female and one as a male. The video takes place in an African jungle village where a female captive (Divine) is at the mercy the village's chief (who's also a witch doctor who is also played by Divine) as he controls his captive with his hard voodoo magic.

Track listings
UK  7-inch single
 "Hard Magic" - 7:10
 "Hard Magic (Instrumental Mix)" - 2:54
 	
German vinyl, 12-inch single
 "Hard Magic" - 7:10
 "Hard Magic (Magic Mix)" - 6:48
 "Hard Magic (Instrumental Mix)" - 2:54

Charts

References

https://www.youtube.com/watch?v=MhSCDNw-ky4

1985 songs
1985 singles
Divine (performer) songs